Angelika Tagwerker (fl. 1990s) is an Austrian luger who competed in the early 1990s. She won the silver medal in the mixed team event at the 1991 FIL World Luge Championships in Winterberg, Germany.

References
Hickok sports information on World champions in luge and skeleton.

Austrian female lugers
Living people
Year of birth missing (living people)